The 1916 Philadelphia Athletics season involved the A's finishing eighth in the American League with a record of 36 wins and 117 losses. The 1916 team is often considered by baseball historians the worst team in American League history, and its .235 winning percentage is still the lowest ever for a modern (post-1900) big-league team.

Regular season

Season standings

Record vs. opponents

Roster

Player stats

Batting

Starters by position 
Note: Pos = Position; G = Games played; AB = At bats; H = Hits; Avg. = Batting average; HR = Home runs; RBI = Runs batted in

Other batters 
Note: G = Games played; AB = At bats; H = Hits; Avg. = Batting average; HR = Home runs; RBI = Runs batted in

Pitching

Starting pitchers 
Note: G = Games pitched; IP = Innings pitched; W = Wins; L = Losses; ERA = Earned run average; SO = Strikeouts

Other pitchers 
Note: G = Games pitched; IP = Innings pitched; W = Wins; L = Losses; ERA = Earned run average; SO = Strikeouts

Relief pitchers 
Note: G = Games pitched; W = Wins; L = Losses; SV = Saves; ERA = Earned run average; SO = Strikeouts

Awards and honors

League top five finishers 
 Bullet Joe Bush: #4 in AL in strikeouts (157)
 Bullet Joe Bush: #3 in AL in shutouts (8)
 Bullet Joe Bush: #3 in AL in complete games (25)
 Bullet Joe Bush: MLB leader in losses (24)
 Bullet Joe Bush: MLB leader in wild pitches (15)
 Bullet Joe Bush: #2 in AL in walks allowed (130)
 Elmer Myers: #2 in AL in strikeouts (182)
 Elmer Myers: #2 in AL in complete games (31)
 Elmer Myers: #2 in AL in losses (23)
 Elmer Myers: MLB leader in earned runs allowed (128)
 Elmer Myers: #2 in AL in hits allowed (280)
 Elmer Myers: MLB leader in walks allowed (168)
 Elmer Myers: #2 in AL in home runs allowed (7)
 Elmer Myers: #2 in AL in wild pitches (13)
 Elmer Myers: #2 in AL in hit batsmen (14)
 Jack Nabors: #3 in AL in losses (20)
 Amos Strunk: #4 in AL in batting average (.316)

See also
List of worst Major League Baseball season records

References

External links
1916 Philadelphia Athletics team page at Baseball Reference
1916 Philadelphia Athletics team page at www.baseball-almanac.com

Oakland Athletics seasons
Philadelphia Athletics season
Oakland